Les Valseurs is a French film production & distribution company founded in 2013 by Damien Megherbi and Justin Pechberty.

They received the 2019 César Award for Best Animated Short Film for Wicked Girl (2017) by Ayce Kartal and an Oscar nomination for the short film Nefta Football Club by Yves Piat in January 2020. On December 21st 2022, they were shortlisted for the 95th Academy Awards under the category Best Live Action Short Film with Sideral (2021).

History

The company was founded in 2013 by Damien Megherbi and Justin Pechberty in Paris, France.

Beside producing its own content, Les Valseurs also act as a distributor. They released Boris Khlebnijov’s Arrhythmia in 2018 and Eugène Green’s Faire la parole in 2017. Their latest release was Sarah Marx's first feature K Contraire in January 2020.

In February 2018, their animated short production Wicked Girl by Ayce Kartal was awarded at Clermont Ferrand International Short Film Festival the National Grand Prize, becoming the first animated short film to be so since the beginning of the festival. In February 2019, Wicked Girl received the César Award for Best Animated Short Film.

In May 2019, their live action short production She Runs received the "Leitz Cine Discovery Prize for Short Film" at Cannes' International Critics' Week.

In September 2019, France Télévisions awarded them the "Jeune Producteur" 30,000€-price.

In January 2020, they received an Oscar nomination for the short film Nefta Football Club by Yves Piat.

Production

Live Action
 Midnight Ramblers (2017) by Julian Ballester – premiered at 2017 This Human World
 Meninas Formicida (2017) by João Paulo Miranda Maria (short film) – premiered at 2017 Mostra di Venezia
 Nefta Football Club (2018) by Yves Piat (short film) – nominated for the 2020 Academy Award for Best Live Action Short Film

La Muerte de un Perro (2019) by Matìas Ganz – premiered at 2019 Tallinn Black Nights Film Festival
 Fendas (2019) by Carlos Segundo – premiered at 2019 Marseille Festival of Documentary Film
 She Runs (2019) by Qiu Yang (short film) – premiered at 2019 Cannes' International Critics' Week
 The Diver (2019) by Michael Leonard & Jamie Helmer (short film) – premiered at 2019 Mostra di Venezia
 Famadihana (2020) by Hugo Rousselin (short film) - premiered at 2020 American French Film Festival
 Electric Bodies (2020) by Antoine Janot (short film) - premiered at 2020 L'Étrange Festival
 Martin fell from a roof (2020) by Matias Ganz (short film) - premiered at 2020 Clermont-Ferrand International Short Film Festival
 Sideral (2021) by Carlos Segundo (short film) - premiered at 2021 Cannes Film Festival
 Big Bang (2022) by Carlos Segundo (short film) - premiered at 2022 Locarno Film Festival, Pardino d'Oro
 The melting creatures (2022) by Diego Céspedes (short film) - premiered at 2022 Semaine de la critique

Animation
 Wicked Girl (2017) by Ayce Kartal (short film) – winner of the 2019 César Award for Best Animated Short Film and 2018 Clermont Ferrand International Short Film Festival's National Grand Prize
 Guaxuma (2019) by Nara Normande (short film) – premiered at 2018 TIFF
 Step into the river (2020) by Weijia Ma (short film) -premiered at 2020 Chicago International Film Festival
 I gotta look good for the apocalypse (2021) by Ayce Kartal (short film) - premiered at 2021 Annecy International Animation Film Festival
 Rules of Success (2022) by Théophile Gibaud (shot film) - premiered internationally at 2022 Flicker's Rhode Island

Documentary
 Après Ta Révolte, Ton Vote (2019) by Kiswendsida Parfait Kaboré – premiered at 2019 IDFA Amsterdam
 My quarantine bear (2021) by Weijia Ma - premiered at 2021 Visions du réel

Projects

Live Action
 Sem Coraçao by Nara Normande & Tião
 Nefta by Yves Piat
 The French Teacher by Ricardo Alves Jr.

Virtual Reality 

 Deusa Das Aguas by Joao Paulo Miranda Maria (short film)

Animation
 Les Décentrés by Marion Boutin & Damien Pelletier (short film)
 Le Noël des Animaux by Camille Alméras, Caroline Attia, Ceylan Beyoglu, Oleysha Shchukina, Haruna Kishi and Natalia Chernysheva

Documentary
 Los Nombres Propios by Fernando Dominguez
The Syrians by Ismaël
 Avec Naomie by Dumas Maçon
 Targuia by Leïla Artese Benhadj

References

External links
 

Film production companies of France